Aračinovo is a village and seat of the municipality of Aračinovo, North Macedonia.

History 
During the 2001 Macedonia conflict, it was occupied by ethnic Albanian insurgents. Later, during violence of the 2008 parliamentary election, a gunman in Aračinovo opened fire on security police. One person was killed and several people were wounded.

On the 2nd of December, 2022, during a routine traffic stop, а driver was asked to show his documents, to which the driver didn't comply and proceeded to call an Armed group. Said group proceeded to chase the Police officers out of Aračinovo and into the Gazi Baba police station.

Demographics
According to the 2021 census, the village had a total of 7.991 inhabitants. Ethnic groups in the village include:
Albanians  7.777
Macedonians 4

Sports
Local football club KF Shkëndija have played in the Macedonian Third League.

References

Villages in Aračinovo Municipality
Albanian communities in North Macedonia